The third competition weekend of the 2009–10 ISU Speed Skating World Cup was held in the Vikingskipet, Hamar, Norway, from Saturday, 21 November, until Sunday, 22 November 2009.

Schedule of events
The schedule of the event is below.

Medal summary

Men's events

Women's events

References

Results

3
Isu World Cup, 2009-10, 3
Sport in Hamar